Opinion privilege is a protected form of speech, of importance to US federal and state law.  The US First Amendment guarantees free speech, subject to certain limitations.  One of these limitations is defamation, in various forms, notably libel.  While federal precedent does not explicitly state that opinion is protected against prosecution under libel laws (indeed it explicitly states the contrary), the combined effect of several rulings is such as to effectively make such the case.

Historical development
Opinion privilege has its roots in the common law fair comment doctrine.

Scope
Opinion based on fact is not protected qua opinion, if the opinion is based on false facts.  Opinion that implies alleged facts has the same standing as the implied alleged fact.

Exceptions
Fact couched as opinion is not protected.  For example, "It is my opinion that he is a liar." would not be treated any differently than "He is a liar."

Relevant cases

 Ollman v. Evans
 Gertz v. Robert Welch, Inc.
 Milkovich v. Lorain Journal Co.
 Hustler Magazine v. Falwell
 Spence v. Flynt 816 P.2d 771 (Wyo. 1991)

References

Bibliography
 Restatement (Second) of Torts
 Nat Stem,Defamation, Epistemology, and the Erosion (But Not Destruction) of the Opinion Privilege
 Esward M. Sussman, Milkovich revisited: "Saving" the Opinion Privilege, Duke Law Journal, pp. 415-448
 Jeffrey E. Thomas, Statements of Fact, Statements of Opinion, and the First Amendment, 74 Cal. L. Rev. pages 1001-1058 (1986).

Legal terminology
Defamation